R3D may refer to:
Douglas DC-5
RealD Cinema
R3D, an American Christian rock band